Callyna is a genus of moths of the family Noctuidae.

Description
Palpi slender and closely appressed to frons, where the third joint reaching just above vertex of head. Antennae of male minutely ciliated. Thorax and abdomen smoothly scaled. Forewings nearly even breadth throughout. The apex and outer margin rounded. Hindwings with vein 5 from below center of discocellulars.

Species
Callyna contrastans Hampson, 1914
Callyna costiplaga Moore, 1885
Callyna cupricolor Hampson, 1902
Callyna decora Walker, 1858
Callyna figurans Walker, 1858
Callyna gaedei Hacker & Fibiger, 2006
Callyna holophaea Hampson, 1911
Callyna jugaria Walker, 1858
Callyna laurae Bryk, 1915
Callyna leuconota Lower, 1903
Callyna leucosticha Turner, 1911
Callyna monoleuca Walker, 1858
Callyna nigerrima Hampson, 1902
Callyna obscura Hampson, 1910
Callyna pectinicornis Gaede, 1915
Callyna perfecta Berio, 1956
Callyna robinsoni Viette, 1965
Callyna semivitta Moore, 1882
Callyna trisagittata Berio, 1970
Callyna unicolor Hampson, 1920

References

 Hacker, H. & Fibiger, M. (2006) "Updated list of Micronoctuidae, Noctuidae (s.l.), and Hyblaeidae species of Yemen, collected during three expeditions in 1996, 1998 and 2000, with comments and descriptions of species." Esperiana Buchreihe zur Entomologie 12: 75-166.
 

Amphipyrinae